The Grammy Award for Best New Country & Western Artist was presented in 1965 and 1966.

Years reflect the year in which the Grammy Awards were presented, for works released in the previous year.

Winners & Nominees

References

Grammy Awards for country music